Göss Abbey is a former Benedictine nunnery and former Cathedral in Göss, now a part of Leoben in Styria, Austria. After the abbey's dissolution in 1782 the church, now a parish church, was the seat of the short-lived Bishopric of Leoben.

History
The nunnery was founded in 1004 by Adula or Adela of Leoben, wife of Count Aribo I, and her son, also called Aribo, the future Archbishop of Mainz, on the family's ancestral lands, and was settled by canonesses from Nonnberg Abbey in Salzburg. The first abbess was Kunigunde, sister of Archbishop Aribo. It was made an Imperial abbey by Henry IV, Holy Roman Emperor, in 1020. The Benedictine Rule was introduced in the 12th century.

Göss Abbey functioned for centuries as a centre for the Styrian aristocracy to have their daughters educated and if necessary accommodated, and entry was strictly limited to members of the nobility.

The nunnery, the last remaining Imperial abbey on Habsburg lands, was dissolved in 1782 in the course of the rationalist reforms of Joseph II, Holy Roman Emperor, and from 1786 served for a short time as the seat of the newly founded Bishopric of Leoben, of which the former abbey church, dedicated to Saint Mary and Saint Andrew, was the cathedral. The first and only bishop died in 1800, and from 1808 the diocese was administered by the Bishops of Seckau until it was formally abolished in 1859. In 1827 the premises were auctioned off and acquired by the wheelwrights' co-operative of Vordernberg, who were primarily interested in the forests of the former abbey's estates. In 1860 the buildings were acquired by a brewer from Graz (the nunnery had had its own brewer since 1459) and have since then been used as a brewery, the Brauerei Göß.

Buildings and contents
The former abbey church, briefly the cathedral of Leoben, is now used as a parish church. It is a large late Gothic building containing an early Romanesque crypt beneath the choir, some important early Gothic frescoes in the chapel of Saint Michael in the Zackenstil or "zigzag style", and an imposing roof. The famous Göss chasuble (Gößer Ornat), a valuable piece of Romanesque silk embroidery, is now preserved in the Museum für angewandte Kunst in Vienna.

Now lost are the former parish church, the graveyard and the buildings formerly to the west of the abbey church. The Brunnhöfl ("fountain courtyard"), still largely extant, is well known.

A curiosity on display in the premises is a rare specimen of a reusable coffin of 1784 with an opening bottom that deposited the bodies inside into a common grave. A product of Josephine rationalism, the intention was to save local authorities the expense of coffins in pauper funerals, but it was a deeply unpopular measure and the coffins were withdrawn after only a few months.

Abbesses of Göss 

Kunigund I, 1020–1027
Wilburgis, 1040
Richardis, 1066
Margaretha, sometime in the 2nd half of the 11th century
Hemma, sometime between 1100 and 1146
Adelheid of Spanheim, 1146–1177
Ottilie I of Guttenberg, 1188–1203
Ottilie II, 1203–1230
Kunigund II, 1239–1269
Herburgis von Ehrenfels, 1271–1283
Euphemia, 1283–1298
Herradis von Breitenfurt, 1298–1322
Berta von Pux und Pranckh, 1322–1338
Diemut, 1340–1349
Katharina von Strettweg, 1349–1354
Gertraut von Hannau, 1355–1372
Katharina von Truthan, 1381–1398
Aloisia von Herberstorf, 1399–1421
Gertrud von Helfenberg, 1421–1428
Anna von Herberstorf, 1428–1463
Bennigna Grassler, 1470–1474
Ursula von Silberberg, 1474–1497
Margaretha von Harbach, 1497–1505
Veronika von Ratmanstorf, 1505–1514
Margaretha von Mindorf, 1514–1523
Barbara von Spangstein, 1523–1543
Amalia von Leisser, 1543–1566
Barbara von Liechtenstein, 1566–1573
Anna von Harrach, 1573–1576
Florientina von Putterer, 1576–1602
Regina von Schrattenbach, 1602–1611
Margaretha von Kuenburg, 1611–1640
Maria Johanna von Kollonitsch, 1640–1657
Maria Benedikta von Schrattenbach, 1657–1695
Katharina Benedikta von Stürgkh, 1695–1706
Maria Mechthildis von Berchthold, 1706–1737
Maria Antonia von Überacker, 1737–1751
Maria Henrica von Poppen, 1751–1779
Maria Gabriela von Schaffmann, 1779–1782

Notes

External links

 Bundesdenkmalamt (BDA): Stift Göss 

Benedictine monasteries in Austria
Monasteries in Styria
1004 establishments in Europe
Christian monasteries established in the 11th century
Religious organizations established in the 1000s
Benedictine nunneries in Austria
Tourist attractions in Styria
1020s establishments in the Holy Roman Empire
1020 establishments in Europe
1782 disestablishments in the Holy Roman Empire
Roman Catholic cathedrals in Austria